Christ Church Regatta is a boat race in the University of Oxford, England, which is held annually during seventh week of Michaelmas term (late November), in which novice crews (of eight rowers with a cox) representing each college, compete against each other. There are separate men's and women's races, with many colleges entering more than one crew. The regatta is organized by Christ Church Boat Club.

Race
The regatta is held on the Isis, the stretch of the River Thames running through Oxford, in Christ Church Meadow (the park in Oxford belonging to Christ Church).

The competition is run over about four days in total, usually from Wednesday of 7th week in Michaelmas Term to Saturday of 7th Week. Races are head-on-head between two teams that are chosen at random. The winner of the race will progress to the next round of races. The loser may be knocked out so that they no longer race. However, the loser of a first round race will enter the repechage, meaning that they have the chance to stay in the competition. The knock-out rounds of the competition proceed until two teams are left to race against each other in the Final.

A regatta of novice crews has potential problems. During the course of the regatta, several races have to be stopped once they have started due to novice crews becoming stranded within the racing lanes.. The regatta was cancelled in 2019 due to high river conditions, and in 2020 due to the COVID-19 pandemic.

See also
 Eights Week
 Torpids

References

External links
 The Oliver Wyman Christ Church Regatta web page
 

Regatta
Regatta
Regattas on the River Thames
Rowing at the University of Oxford
Events in Oxford
November events
Annual events in England
Annual sporting events in the United Kingdom